The 2005 Ottawa Renegades season was the fourth and final season for the team in the Canadian Football League. The Renegades finished the season with a 7–11 record and failed to make the playoffs.

Offseason

CFL Draft

Preseason

Regular season

Season standings

Season schedule

Playoffs
The Saskatchewan Roughriders (the 4th place team in the West division) had more points than The Ottawa Renegades (who finished 3rd in the East division), and under the CFL's "crossover" rule, The Ottawa Renegades would not qualify for the 2005 CFL playoffs.

References

Ottawa Renegades
2005